SimBioSys (short for Simulated Biological Systems) is technology company  deploying a combination of artificial intelligence and biophysical simulations to improve our understanding of cancer.   
 
SimBioSys has developed a simulation engine, TumorScope, which utilizes the current standard of care diagnostic data (imaging & pathology) to create spatially resolved virtual replicas of an individual tumor and microenvironment and uses mechanistic models to incorporate the major hallmarks of cancer including drug sensitivity & delivery, metabolism, mechanical forces. The simulations enable precise & comprehensive predictions of response to therapy while providing researchers and clinicians keys insights into mechanisms of resistance. By virtualizing cancer, clinicians and patients are empowered with a better understanding of the disease and can assess all available options computationally to truly individualize treatment. 

In the crowded world of genomics, new approaches have many barriers to becoming a new standard of care. SimBioSys complements and/or supersedes current precision medicine techniques while only relying on readily available and previously acquired datasets.

Products
The first indication to market will be Early Stage Breast Cancer where there is significant opportunity to improve outcomes by selecting the right first line therapy while de-escalating care and lowering costs and side effects.

A retrospective studies across 800 patients have shown volumetric errors under 4% and in a recent pivotal study at University of Chicago, TumorScope™ produced  91% sensitivity and 93% specificity rates of predicting complete response to the physician's choice of therapy at the time of diagnosis. SimBioSys collaborates with over 130 oncologists across the country representing 16  premier cancer centers such University of Chicago, University of North Carolina, OHSU, among others.
 
SimBioSys anticipates FDA clearance for breast cancer in late 2021 with an expansion to other solid tumors to follow. Validation to lung and prostate cancer is already underway. While awaiting FDA approval, SimBioSys is commercializing the technology for use in patient education and drug development.

See also
 Precision Medicine
 Clinical Trial Optimization
 Virtual Trials
 Drug design

References

External links
 

Life sciences industry
Companies based in Champaign County, Illinois
American companies established in 2018
2018 establishments in Illinois